Hoss is the surname of:

 Américo Hoss (1916–1990), Hungarian-Argentine cinematographer
 Bernd Hoss (1939–2016), German football manager
 Elijah Embree Hoss (1849–1919), American bishop
 George W. Hoss (1824-1906), American educator
 Hal E. Hoss (1892–1934), American journalist and politician
 Nina Hoss (born 1975), German actress and singer
 Rudolf Höss (1901–1947), German Nazi commandant of Auschwitz concentration and extermination camp who was executed for war crimes
 Selim Hoss (born 1929), Lebanese politician